Kafkanas is an island in the Aegean Sea, just off the town of Stagira. Anciently it was known as Caprus or Kapros, a name shared with Caprus, the port of ancient Stagira.

References

Islands of Greece